The Ohio Reformatory for Women (ORW) is a state prison for women owned and operated by the Ohio Department of Rehabilitation and Correction in Marysville, Ohio. It opened in September 1916, when 34 female inmates were transferred from the Ohio Penitentiary in Columbus. ORW is a multi-security, state facility. As of July 2019, 2,394 female inmates were living at the prison ranging from minimum-security inmates all the way up to one inmate on death row. It was the fifth prison in the United States, in modern times, to open a nursery for imprisoned mothers and their babies located within the institution. The Achieving Baby Care Success (ABC) program was the first in the state to keep infants with their mothers.

History

Originally, the prison consisted of one stone building, known as the Harmon Building. The prison was also a functioning farm, complete with dairy cattle, hogs, and grain, which the inmates ran. Although ORW no longer operates as a farm, it is still commonly referred to as "the farm."
A former probation and juvenile court officer, Louise M. Mittendorf, was the first superintendent of the prison. She was appointed in March 1916 to an indefinite term. She resigned in 1935 and died four years later.

Originally, inmates were housed in the Harmon building, but eventually additional cottages were built. (There are now approximately 11 cottages.) Plumbing was later added in the 1950s. Before this, the inmates did not have the privilege of indoor plumbing and had to use "slop jars." In 1961, Clearview School opened at the prison and the Ohio Reformatory for Women became the first in the state to have an official Adult Education Program. Along with this they also offer reintegration programs, college classes, and other trades.

Disturbances

Riots occurred at ORW from time to time. Around the 1950s, the first male guard was hired. A guard's job mostly consisted of supervising inmates and breaking up fights. In 1968, one of the main cottages was almost ruined due to a fire during an inmate disturbance. Only a few years later, a group of inmates gathered and rioted in one of the other cottages. These offenders were consequently sent to the Ohio Penitentiary for maximum-security supervision. A decade later, the last escape from the institution occurred and more wire was added to the external fence of the prison to prevent any more women from escaping. The addition of wire occurred the same year that the first male warden, H.L. Morris, was appointed.

Prison nursery

In 2000, Governor Bob Taft signed a House Bill that permitted the Ohio Reformatory for Women to establish a residential nursery. The following summer, under the Direction of Warden Deb Timmerman-Cooper, ORW opened up the only nursery program of its kind in the state. At the time, New York, Nebraska and Washington were the only other states in the United States that had any type of nursery for incarcerated mothers.

The Achieving Baby Care Success (ABC) program at ORW makes it possible for pregnant offenders to keep custody of their newborns after they give birth. Each case is dealt with individually and each mother is assigned a plan that fits. The plan is for the baby and the mother to leave the prison together. , there were eight babies in the program according to the Ohio Department of Rehabilitation and Correction website.

ORW employees have observed that mothers who have participated in and graduated from the ABC program are rarely repeat offenders.
There are certain qualifications and standards that the mother must meet before she is allowed to be a part of the nursery program. The mother inmate must have given birth to the baby while in Ohio state custody. Having a violent record would disqualify her from the program. The mother must attend family training courses with hands-on parenting instruction, maintain good mental and physical health, be serving a short term, and follow many other specific rules.

The nursery program at ORW is housed in a separate wing of the establishment and contains double occupancy rooms for up to twenty mothers with their infants. The wing also includes a recreation area, a laundry room, and the unit's own childcare center.

In the media
Comedian/actress Mo'Nique filmed the Showtime Stand-up Comedy Special, I Coulda Been Your Cellmate (2006), and TV documentary, Mo'Nique Behind Bars (2007), at ORW.

In 2010 the National Geographic Channel released the documentary Hard Time: Female Offenders, reporting on how the Ohio Reformatory for Women is tested by every type of female offender, from murderers to nursing mothers and everything in between.

Notable inmates
Donna Roberts- Roberts was convicted in 2003 of recruiting Nathaniel E. Jackson while he was still in prison to kill her ex-husband Robert Fingerhut, which he did on December 11, 2001, in the house Roberts and Fingerhut continued to share after their private divorce. In her appeal, it is alleged that the police performed an illegal search of her car parked inside the garage since the search warrant was only for the home. She is the only woman on death row in the State of Ohio.
 Nicole Diar- Murderer convicted of murdering her son Jacob.
Claudia Hoerig, convicted of murdering her husband, Karl, and fleeing to Brazil, sentenced to life imprisonment with possibility of parole after 28 years

References

Prisons in Ohio
Women's prisons in the United States
Capital punishment in Ohio
Buildings and structures in Union County, Ohio
Women in Ohio
1916 establishments in Ohio